"Tell Me 'bout It" is a song by English singer and songwriter Joss Stone from her third studio album, Introducing Joss Stone (2007). It was written by Stone, Raphael Saadiq and Robert Ozuna (half of the duo Jake and the Phatman), and produced by Saadiq. The song was released in March 2007 as the album's lead single.

Music video

The music video for "Tell Me 'bout It" was directed by Bryan Barber and filmed on location at 5 Pointz, an industrial building used as a graffiti space located in Queens, New York City. In December 2006, the place's owner, graffiti artist Jonathan "Meres" Cohen, received a phone call from a representative for Stone, asking him to use 5 Pointz as the backdrop for the single's video. He was initially unaware of who Stone was, but he eventually gave permission to her crew after speaking to her. Cohen would later be in charge of Stone's body painting for the cover art and the photo shoot of Introducing Joss Stone.

Accompanying its setting, the video is noted for its hip hop-related elements such as graffiti and breakdancers. It features cameo appearances by Saadiq, who appears at the beginning playing the bass, and Cohen, who is shown at the end doing a mural of Stone's face, reminiscent of her face on the cover of her album Mind Body & Soul (2004).

Chart performance
The single debuted at number 80 on the UK Singles Chart on 24 February 2007, it fell to number 92 the second week, two weeks later it went to its peak of 28, having spent six weeks on the Top 100. Having previously topped the US Bubbling Under Hot 100 Singles chart, "Tell Me 'bout It" debuted on the Billboard Hot 100 at number 83 in late March, becoming Stone's first solo single to enter the chart.

Use in media
The song was used in the second episode of the first season of The CW's series Gossip Girl, titled "The Wild Brunch", which originally aired on 25 September 2007. It was also used in the soundtrack to the 2007 EA Sports video game NBA Live 08, and Saints Row 2.

Track listings
UK and German CD single
"Tell Me 'bout It" – 2:53
"My God" – 3:48

Digital download – A Yam Who? Rework
"Tell Me 'bout It" (A Yam Who? Rework) – 4:21
"Tell Me 'bout It" (A Yam Who? Club Rework) – 9:38

Credits and personnel
Credits adapted from the liner notes of Introducing Joss Stone.

 Joss Stone – lead vocals, songwriting
 Chalmers "Spanky" Alford – guitar
 Oswald Bowe – assistant engineering
 Chuck Brungardt – mixing, recording
 Tom Coyne – mastering
 Reggie Dozier – horn recording, string recording
 Joi Gilliam – backing vocals
 Keisha Jackson – backing vocals
 Jeremy Mackenzie – Pro Tools operator
 Marlon Marcel – assistant engineering
 Robert Ozuna – drums, turntablism, songwriting

 Khari Parker – additional drums
 Jermaine Paul – backing vocals
 Raphael Saadiq – bass, guitar, horn arrangements, production, songwriting
 Glenn Standridge – mixing, recording
 Charlie Stavish – assistant engineering
 Neil Symonette – percussion
 James Tanksley – assistant engineering
 John Tanksley – assistant engineering
 Benjamin Wright – string arrangements

Charts

Weekly charts

Year-end charts

References

2007 singles
2007 songs
Alternative hip hop songs
Joss Stone songs
Music videos directed by Bryan Barber
Relentless Records singles
Song recordings produced by Raphael Saadiq
Songs written by Joss Stone
Songs written by Raphael Saadiq
Songs written by Robert Ozuna
Virgin Records singles